Conus zebra is a species of sea snail, a marine gastropod mollusk in the family Conidae, the cone snails and their allies.

Like all species within the genus Conus, these snails are predatory and venomous. They are capable of "stinging" humans, therefore live ones should be handled carefully or not at all.

Description
The size of the shell varies between 20 mm and 40 mm. The shell is cylindrically ovate, with a moderate, smooth spire. The body whorl is encircled below by distant grooves. The shell is clouded with olivaceous, ashy blue and chestnut-brown, with revolving lines articulated of chestnut and white spots. The aperture is brown-stained.

Distribution
This marine species is known to occur off the Solomons, Papua New Guinea and Irian Jaya, Indonesia and off the Philippines.

References

External links
 The Conus Biodiversity website
 Cone Shells – Knights of the Sea
 

zebra
Gastropods described in 1810